Alan Devlin (b. 1948 – d. 13 May, 2011) was an Irish actor.

He was born in Dublin, the son of a jazz musician. He was brought up in Booterstown and studied in Mount Merrion. His acting career began with the New Irish Players in Killarney. He starred in many TV shows such as Ballykissangel and also starred alongside many internationally recognised film stars in many big Hollywood productions as well as independent productions and on stage in his beloved theatre. He is best known for his roles in Chekhov's The Seagull and Eugene O'Neill's A Moon for the Misbegotten and The Clash of the Ash. He won an Olivier Award for his role in the latter. Devlin died suddenly at his home in Dalkey, Dublin on 13 May 2011.

References

External links
 

Irish male stage actors
1948 births
2011 deaths
People from Dún Laoghaire–Rathdown
Laurence Olivier Award winners
Male actors from County Dublin